Hans Oskar Jonathan Augustinsson (born 30 March 1996) is a Swedish professional footballer who plays for Rosenborg as a left-back.

Club career 
Augustinsson signed for Rosenborg BK in 2021, signing a four-year contract with the club.

International career 
He made his debut for the Sweden national team on 8 January 2019 in a friendly against Finland, as a starter.

Personal life 
Jonathan is the younger brother of Sevilla's Ludwig Augustinsson, who is currently on loan with Aston Villa that also plays in the same position.

Career statistics

Club

Honours
Djurgårdens IF
 Allsvenskan: 2019
 Svenska Cupen: 2017–18

References

External links 
 Djurgården profile 
 
 

1996 births
Living people
Association football defenders
Footballers from Stockholm
Swedish footballers
Sweden youth international footballers
Sweden international footballers
Allsvenskan players
IF Brommapojkarna players
Djurgårdens IF Fotboll players
Rosenborg BK players